Tomáš Nosek (born 1 September 1992) is a Czech professional ice hockey forward currently playing for the Boston Bruins of the National Hockey League (NHL).

Playing career

Junior
Prior to turning professional, Nosek recorded 53 goals and 72 assists in 109 games at the under-20 level for HC Pardubice and 27 goals and 36 assists in 67 games at the under-18 circuit.

Nosek has appeared in 129 games in the Czech Republic's top league since 2011–12, totaling 62 points, including 24 goals and 38 assists, and helping his club capture the league championship during his rookie season.

During the 2012–13 season, Nosek recorded five goals and nine assists in 50 games with the team, adding four goals and one assist in five games with Královští Lvi in 1. národní hokejová liga and five goals and nine assists in just six games with HC Pardubice's under-20 team.

During the 2013–14 season, in his third season for HC Pardubice, Nosek lead the team in scoring with 19 goals and 25 assists in 52 games. In addition to leading the team in goals and assists, Nosek had a club-best plus-17 rating and contributed three goals and three assists in 10 postseason appearances.

Professional
During the 2014–15 season, Nosek recorded 11 goals and 23 assists in 55 games for the Grand Rapids Griffins. He was tied with teammate Nick Jensen for the league lead with a plus-30 rating despite being limited to 55 games due to injury. During the Calder Cup playoffs, he recorded two goals and five assists in 12 games.

On 14 June 2014, Nosek signed a two-year entry-level contract with the Detroit Red Wings.

On 19 December 2015, Nosek was recalled by the Red Wings. Prior to being recalled, he recorded two goals and five assists in 25 games with the Griffins. He made his NHL debut for the Red Wings on 26 December in a game against the Nashville Predators. He was assigned to the Griffins on 5 January 2016. In six games for the Red Wings, he registered two penalty minutes, six hits and three takeaways while averaging 10:08 time on ice during his first NHL call-up.

On 27 May 2016, Nosek signed a two-year contract extension with the Red Wings. On 18 March 2017, Nosek was recalled by the Red Wings. Prior to being recalled, Nosek recorded 15 goals and 24 assists in 48 games with the Griffins. Following the conclusion of the Red Wings season, Nosek was assigned to the Griffins. Nosek appeared in 11 games for the Red Wings, and recorded his first career NHL goal on 28 March against Cam Ward of the Carolina Hurricanes. During the 2016–17 season, Nosek recorded 15 goals and 26 assists in 51 games during the regular season. During the 2017 Calder Cup playoffs, he was the team's leading scorer recording 10 goals and 12 assists in 19 games, to help lead the Griffins to the Calder Cup championship.

On 21 June 2017, Nosek was selected by the Vegas Golden Knights in the 2017 NHL Expansion Draft. On 10 October 2017, Nosek scored the Knights' first franchise goal on home ice at the T-Mobile Arena. The Knights qualified for the 2018 Stanley Cup playoffs, where Nosek scored his first career playoff goal on 18 May 2018, against the Winnipeg Jets. As a restricted free agent, Nosek signed a one-year, $962,500 contract with the Golden Knights on 18 July.

On 1 July 2019, Nosek re-signed with the Golden Knights on a one-year, $1 million deal.

After four years as an original member of the Golden Knights, Nosek left as a free agent following the  season. On 28 July 2021, Nosek was signed by the Boston Bruins to a two-year, $3.5 million contract. Nosek scored his first goal as a Bruin on 22 October 2021, in a 4-1 victory over the Buffalo Sabres.

International play
Nosek represented the Czech Republic at the 2012 World Junior Ice Hockey Championships, where he served as team captain and recorded one assist in six games.

Career statistics

Regular season and playoffs

International

Awards and honours

References

External links
 

1992 births
Living people
Boston Bruins players
Czech expatriate ice hockey players in the United States
Czech ice hockey left wingers
Czech expatriate ice hockey people
Detroit Red Wings players
Grand Rapids Griffins players
HC Chrudim players
HC Dynamo Pardubice players
Sportspeople from Pardubice
Stadion Hradec Králové players
Undrafted National Hockey League players
Vegas Golden Knights players